Wilhelm von Apell (16 January 1892 – 7 March 1969) was a German general in the Wehrmacht during World War II who commanded the 22nd Panzer Division. He was a recipient of the Knight's Cross of the Iron Cross of Nazi Germany.

Biography
Born in 1892, Apell joined the army of Imperial Germany as an Fahnen-junker (officer cadet) in 1910. He was commissioned in the light infantry and fought in World War I. In the interwar period, he served in the Reichsheer and then the Wehrmacht. He led the 11th Cavalry Rifle Regiment of the 4th Light Division from 1938 to 1940, fighting in the Invasion of Poland.

The 4th Light Division converted to armour in early 1940 and then, designated the 9th Panzer Division, it served in the campaign in the Netherlands and the Battle of France. It was also involved in the Invasion of Yugoslavia and Battle of Greece the following year. By now, Apell, still with the division, was commander of the 9th Schützen (Rifle) Brigade. During his period in command of the 9th Schützen Brigade, he was awarded the Knight's Cross of the Iron Cross.

In September 1941 and now a generalmajor, Apell was appointed commander of the newly raised 22nd Panzer Division. Formed in France, much of the division's equipment was captured and foreign equipment with relatively few modern tanks. With its training completed, the division was transferred to the Eastern Front in February 1942. Apell led the division through the Battle of the Kerch Peninsula until July 1942, when he became ill and was replaced.

Not returned to his command upon recovering his health, Apell was placed in the Führerreserve (Leader's Reserve) until March 1943. He was made the Replacement Army Inspector in Vienna and, having received a promotion to generalleutnant, served in this role for the remainder of the war. He died in the village of Varnhalt, near Baden-Baden, on 7 March 1969.

Notes
Footnotes

Citations

References

 

1892 births
1969 deaths
People from Bückeburg
People from Schaumburg-Lippe
Lieutenant generals of the German Army (Wehrmacht)
German Army personnel of World War I
Recipients of the clasp to the Iron Cross, 1st class
Recipients of the Knight's Cross of the Iron Cross
German prisoners of war in World War II held by the United States
Military personnel from Lower Saxony